= Chhindwada =

- city
- Location within Madhya Pradesh Location within India
- Coordinates: 23.3897266°N 77.2548837°E
- Country: India
- State: Madhya Pradesh
- Elevation: 521 m (1,709 ft)

Population (2011)
  - Total: 1,906
- Time zone: UTC+5:30 (IST)
- ISO 3166 code: MP-IN
- 2011 census code: 482346

Chhindwada is a city in Madhya Pradesh, India.It is also known as Corn city which is located in between the hills of satpuda range.

== Demographics ==
According to the 2011 census of India, Chhindwada has 388 households. The effective literacy rate (i.e. the literacy rate of population excluding children aged 6 and below) is 65.32%.

Demographics (2011 Census)
	Total	Male	Female
Population	1906	991	915
Children aged below 6 years	277	141	136
Scheduled caste	362	185	177
Scheduled tribe	4	1	3
Literates	1064	622	442
Workers (all)	819	521	298
Main workers (total)	425	385	40
Main workers: Cultivators	247	233	14
Main workers: Agricultural labourers	137	122	15
Main workers: Household industry workers	7	4	3
Main workers: Other	34	26	8
Marginal workers (total)	394	136	258
Marginal workers: Cultivators	73	2	71
Marginal workers: Agricultural labourers	314	132	182
Marginal workers: Household industry workers	7	2	5
Marginal workers: Others	0	0	0
Non-workers	1087	470	617
